The 1982–83 Úrvalsdeild karla was the 32nd season of the Úrvalsdeild karla, the top tier men's basketball league on Iceland. The season started on 1 October 1982 and ended on 21 March 1983. Valur won its second title by posting the best record in the league with a win against Keflavík in the last day of the season.

Competition format
The participating teams first played a conventional round-robin schedule with every team playing each opponent twice "home" and twice "away" for a total of 20 games. The top team won the national championship whilst the bottom team was relegated to Division I.

Regular season

Notable occurrences
In November 1982, Pétur Guðmundsson returned to Iceland after playing with the Portland Trail Blazers and joined Íþróttafélag Reykjavíkur. Prior to his arrival, ÍR was last in the league, having lost all 6 games. With Pétur, the team won 9 of its last 14 games, finishing third in the league, and made it to the Cup finals where it lost to Valur, 75–78. In 14 Úrvalsdeild games, Pétur averaged 28.0 points per game.

References

External links
Official Icelandic Basketball Federation website
1982-1983 Úrvalsdeild statistics

Icelandic
Úrvalsdeild karla (basketball)